WRUB (106.5 MHz) is a commercial FM radio station broadcasting a Spanish contemporary hits format.  Licensed to Sarasota, Florida, it serves the Sarasota / Bradenton / Tampa Bay Areas.  The station is owned by iHeartMedia, Inc., with studios on West Gandy Boulevard in Tampa.

WRUB has an effective radiated power (ERP) of 15,000 watts.  It broadcasts using HD Radio technology.  The transmitter is near the intersection of 33rd Street W and 8th Avenue W in Memphis, south of the Sunshine Skyway Bridge.  That gives WRUB city-grade coverage not only in the Sarasota-Bradenton area, but also around Tampa Bay and as far north as Largo. The station's coverage area extends north towards Lakeland and Pasco County.  WRUB rebroadcasts on 250-watt FM translator 103.1 W276CR in Bradenton.

History

WSPB-FM
The original call sign was WSPB-FM, the sister station to WSPB 1450 AM (now WSDV). WSPB-FM was first heard on 106.3 MHz, powered at 3,000 watts. In its early days, it mostly simulcast the full service, middle of the road format on 1450, including popular adult music, news and sports. WSPB-AM-FM were network affiliates of CBS Radio.  

In the 1970s, WSPB-FM switched to an automated easy listening format.  The station went through several formats and call letter changes.  In 1999, it became WCTQ playing country music.

WCTQ and WLTQ-FM
On February 24, 2016, WCTQ began simulcasting its country format on 92.1 MHz in Venice, Florida.  The AC format on "The Coast" WLTQ-FM was changed to country music, and that station was re-branded as "92.1 CTQ."  This was in preparation for a new format on the 106.5 frequency. The flip put WCTQ back on its previous home on the dial, which it occupied from 1987 to 1999. 

On February 29, 2016, WCTQ at 106.5 changed its call letters to WLTQ-FM.  On March 7, 2016, WLTQ-FM switched its format to Spanish contemporary hits, branded as "Rumba 106.5".  The station targeted not just the Saratoga area but also the Tampa Bay radio market to the north.

WRUB
On March 14, 2016, Rumba 106.5 began simulcasting on FM translator 100.3 W262CP Bayonet Point, which is fed by the signal from co-owned 103.5 WFUS-HD2.  The translator broadcasts directionally to the south from its transmitter in Holiday.  It serves northern Pinellas County (but not its city of license of Bayonet Point, which is further north from Holiday).  The extra signal is needed, due to interference with the 106.5 frequency from WGHR Spring Hill.  That same day, 106.5 changed its call sign to WRUB to match the new format and the "Rumba" moniker.  

WRUB has since discontinued broadcasting over 100.3 W262CP, which now rebroadcasts Salem Media Group station 570 AM WTBN Pinellas Park.  It now is heard on translator W276CR on 103.1 MHz in Bradenton.

References

External links

RUB (FM)
Radio stations established in 1965
IHeartMedia radio stations
1965 establishments in Florida
Contemporary hit radio stations in the United States